The Rock River is a  river on the Upper Peninsula of Michigan in the United States, flowing to Lake Michigan.

See also
List of rivers of Michigan

References

Michigan  Streamflow Data from the USGS

Rivers of Michigan
Tributaries of Lake Michigan